Caladenia microchila, commonly known as the western wispy spider orchid, is a species of orchid endemic to the south-west of Western Australia. It is relatively common orchid with a single erect, hairy leaf and up to three wispy white flowers with narrow lateral sepals and petals and a white labellum with red markings.

Description 
The sepals and petals have long, dark, reddish-brown, thread-like tips. The sides of the labellum have short, blunt teeth and there two rows of creamish-white, anvil-shaped calli, sometimes with red tips, along the centre. Flowering occurs from July to early October.

Taxonomy and naming 
Caladenia microchila was first described in 2001 by Stephen Hopper and Andrew Phillip Brown and the description was published in Nuytsia. The specific epithet (microchila) is derived from the Ancient Greek words mikros meaning "small" and cheilos meaning "lip" referring to the relatively small labellum of this species.

Distribution and habitat 
The western wispy spider orchid occurs between Kondinin and Madura in the Avon Wheatbelt, Coolgardie, Esperance Plains, Hampton and Mallee biogeographic regions where it grows in a range of habitats including granite outcrops and salt lake margins.

Conservation
Caladenia microchila is classified as "not threatened" by the Western Australian Government Department of Parks and Wildlife.

References 

microchila
Orchids of Western Australia
Endemic orchids of Australia
Plants described in 2001
Endemic flora of Western Australia
Taxa named by Stephen Hopper
Taxa named by Andrew Phillip Brown